Edmund Bastard may refer to:

Edmund Bastard (politician) (1758–1816), British politician
Edmund Pollexfen Bastard (1784–1838), British politician

See also
Bastard (disambiguation)